A fetish magazine is a type of magazine originating in the late 1940s which is devoted to sexual fetishism. The content is generally aimed at being erotic rather than pornographic. 

The most well-known early examples are Bizarre (1946-1959) published by John Willie and Leonard Burtman's Exotique, Masque, Connoisseur, Bizarre Life, High Heels, Unique World, and Corporal. Much of the content in fetish magazines (leather, rubber and latex clothing, cross-dressing, bondage, masochism, female domination, roleplaying, corporal punishment, etc.) is baffling to people who do not share the particular fetishes discussed and depicted.

An early study, The Undergrowth of Literature by Gillian Freeman (1967), concluded that such magazines provide a catharsis for those whose sexual needs are otherwise unsatisfied: she identified rubberwear magazines as the most popular at the time.

Rubberist magazines

 AtomAge
 Dressing for Pleasure 
 Marquis
 «O»
 Pussy Cat (UK, N.A. Burton, 1964-1989)
 Shiny International 
 Skin Two
 Bedeseme

Bondage magazines

 Centurian Bondage
 Bizarre
 Bizarre Life (Consolidated Publishing Inc., 1966-1971)
 Exotique
 Bondage in the Buff (House of Milan, 1982 - 1999)
 Bondage Photographer (House of Milan, 1982 - 2000)
 Captured (House of Milan, 1975 - 1999)
 Hogtie (House of Milan, 1972 - 1992)
 Hogtied (House of Milan, 1993 - 1999)
 Knotty (House of Milan, 1971 - 2002)
 Secret (1991-2008)

Spanking magazines
 Blushes (UK, c. 1980s)
 Corporal (Consolidated Publishing/Eros-Goldstripe, 1960s-70s)
 Februs (UK, 1994-2003)
 Janus (UK, 1971-2007)
 Kane (UK, 1982 to present, ed. Harrison Marks 1982–1997)
 Over-The-Knee (Lyndon Distributors Ltd., 1980s-90s)
 Phoenix (UK, 1980-1991)
 Punished (House of Milan, 1978-2001)
 Roué (UK, c. 1978-1988)
 Spank Hard (Lyndon Distributors Ltd., 1990s)
 Stand Corrected (Shadow Lane, 1990s)

Femdom magazines
 Black and Blue 

 Capitulation
 Cruella
 Dominant Mystique 
 Domination Directory International
 Fetish World
 Forced Womanhood
 Obey
 The Vault 
 Whap!

Cultural magazines
 Bizarre (UK, Dennis Publishing, 1997–2015)
 Fet-X
 Fetish Times (UK, editor Mark Ramsden, 1994–?)
 KFS Magazine 
 Demasque Magazine

Other
 Splosh! (UK, 1989–2001) – wet and messy fetishism
 Girl in the Fishnet! – fishnet fetishism
 Leash Magazine (Canada) – fetish and BDSM magazine
 Whiplash (Canada) – fetish and BDSM magazine
 Smoke Signals – smoking fetishism magazine
 Wet Set Magazine (Australia) – omorashi magazine
 Modern Dungeon Quarterly (Perverted Imp Productions, 2012– ) – fetish, kink and BDSM magazine
 Von Gutenberg (Canada) – fetish fashion, fantasy and lifestyle magazine
 Bedeseme Magazine (Spain, 2009) – alternative lifestyle, fetish and kink magazine

See also
 Fetish fashion
 Fetish model

References

 
Magazines
Sex industry